Do Not Track (DNT) is a formerly official HTTP header field, designed to allow internet users to opt-out of tracking by websites—which includes the collection of data regarding a user's activity across multiple distinct contexts, and the retention, use, or sharing of data derived from that activity outside the context in which it occurred.

The Do Not Track header was originally proposed in 2009 by researchers Christopher Soghoian, Sid Stamm, and Dan Kaminsky. Mozilla Firefox became the first browser to implement the feature, while Internet Explorer, Apple's Safari, Opera and Google Chrome all later added support. Efforts to standardize Do Not Track by the W3C in the Tracking Preference Expression (DNT) Working Group reached only the Candidate Recommendation stage and ended in September 2018 due to insufficient deployment and support.

DNT is not widely adopted by the industry, with companies citing the lack of legal mandates for its use, (see Do Not Track legislation) as well as unclear standards and guidelines for how websites are to interpret the header. Thus, critics purport that it is not guaranteed enabling DNT will actually have any effect at all. The W3C disbanded its DNT working group in January 2019, citing insufficient support and adoption. Apple discontinued support for DNT the following month, citing browser fingerprinting concerns. As of March 2023, Mozilla Firefox continues to support DNT, where it is turned on by default in private browsing mode and optional in regular mode.

In 2020, a coalition of US-based internet companies announced the Global Privacy Control header that spiritually succeeds Do Not Track header. The creators hope that this new header will meet the definition of "user-enabled global privacy controls" defined by the California Consumer Privacy Act (CCPA) and European General Data Protection Regulation (GDPR). In this case, the new header would be automatically strengthened by existing laws and companies would be required to honor it.

Operation 
The DNT header accepts three values: 1 in case the user does not want to be tracked (opt out), 0 in case the user consents to being tracked (opt in), or null (no header sent) if the user has not expressed a preference. The default behavior required by the standard is not to send the header unless the user enables the setting via their browser or their choice is implied by use of that specific browser.

History 
In 2007, several consumer advocacy groups asked the U.S. Federal Trade Commission to create a Do Not Track list for online advertising. The proposal would have required that online advertisers submit their information to the FTC, which would compile a machine-readable list of the domain names used by those companies to place cookies or otherwise track consumers.

In July 2009, researchers Christopher Soghoian and Sid Stamm created a prototype add-on for the Firefox web browser, implementing support for the Do Not Track header. Stamm was, at the time, a privacy engineer at Mozilla, while Soghoian soon afterward started working at the FTC. One year later, during a U.S. Senate privacy hearing, FTC Chairman Jon Leibowitz told the Senate Commerce Committee that the commission was exploring the idea of proposing a "do-not-track" list.

In December 2010, the FTC issued a privacy report that called for a "do not track" system that would enable people to avoid having their actions being monitored online.

One week later, Microsoft announced that its next browser would include support for Tracking Protection Lists that block tracking of consumers using blacklists supplied by third parties. In January 2011, Mozilla announced that its Firefox browser would soon provide a Do Not Track solution, via a browser header. Microsoft's Internet Explorer 9,
Apple's Safari, Opera and Google Chrome all later added support for the header approach.

In August 2015 a coalition of privacy groups led by the Electronic Frontier Foundation using W3C's Tracking Preference Expression (DNT) standard proposed that "Do not track" be the goal for advocates to demand of businesses.

In January 2019, the W3C Tracking Protection Working Group was disbanded, citing "insufficient deployment of these extensions" and lack of "indications of planned support among user agents, third parties, and the ecosystem at large." Beginning the following month, Apple removed DNT support from Safari, citing that it could be used as a "fingerprinting variable" for tracking.

Internet Explorer 10 default setting controversy 
When using the "Express" settings upon installation, a Do Not Track option is enabled by default for Internet Explorer 10 and Windows 8. Microsoft faced criticism for its decision to enable Do Not Track by default from advertising companies, who say that use of the Do Not Track header should be a choice made by the user and must not be automatically enabled. The companies also said that this decision would violate the Digital Advertising Alliance's agreement with the U.S. government to honor a Do Not Track system, because the coalition said it would only honor such a system if it were not enabled by default by web browsers. A Microsoft spokesperson defended its decision however, stating that users would prefer a web browser that automatically respected their privacy.

On September 7, 2012, Roy Fielding, an author of the Do Not Track standard, committed a patch to the source code of the Apache HTTP Server, which would make the server explicitly ignore any use of the Do Not Track header by users of Internet Explorer 10. Fielding wrote that Microsoft's decision "deliberately violates" the Do Not Track specification because it "does not protect anyone's privacy unless the recipients believe it was set by a real human being, with a real preference for privacy over personalization". The Do Not Track specification did not explicitly mandate that the use of Do Not Track actually be a choice until after the feature was implemented in Internet Explorer 10. According to Fielding, Microsoft knew its Do Not Track signals would be ignored, and that its goal was to effectively give an illusion of privacy while still catering to their own interests. On October 9, 2012, Fielding's patch was commented out, restoring the previous behavior.

On April 3, 2015, Microsoft announced that starting with Windows 10, it would comply with the specification and no longer automatically enable Do Not Track as part of the operating system's "Express" default settings, but that the company will "provide customers with clear information on how to turn this feature on in the browser settings should they wish to do so".

Adoption 
Very few advertising companies actually supported DNT, due to a lack of regulatory or voluntary requirements for its use, and unclear standards over how websites should respond to the header. Websites that honor DNT requests include Medium and Pinterest. Despite offering the option in its Chrome web browser, Google did not implement support for DNT on its websites, and directed users to its online privacy settings and opt-outs for interest-based advertising instead. The Digital Advertising Alliance, Council of Better Business Bureaus and the Direct Marketing Association does not require its members to honor DNT signals.

Use of ad blocking software to block web trackers and advertising has become increasingly common (with users citing both privacy concerns and performance impact as justification), while Apple and Mozilla began to add privacy enhancements (such as "tracking protection") to their browsers, that are designed to reduce undue cross-site tracking. In addition, laws such as the European Union's General Data Protection Regulation (GDPR) have imposed restrictions on how companies are to store and process personal information.

Princeton University associate professor of computer science Jonathan Mayer, who was a member of the W3C's working group for DNT, argued that the concept is a "failed experiment".

Global Privacy Control
Global Privacy Control (GPC) is a proposed HTTP header field and DOM property that can be used to inform websites of the user's wish to have their information not be sold or used by ad trackers. GPC was developed in 2020 by privacy technology researchers such as Wesleyan University professor Sebastian Zimmeck and former Chief Technologist of the Federal Trade Commission Ashkan Soltani, as well as a group of privacy-focused companies including the Electronic Frontier Foundation, Automattic (owner of Tumblr and WordPress), and more. The signal has been implemented by DuckDuckGo's privacy extension, The New York Times, and privacy browser Brave and is supported by Firefox creator, Mozilla as well as former California Attorney General Xavier Becerra. GPC is a spiritual successor to the Do Not Track header that was created in 2009 but didn't find widespread success due to the lack of legislation that would require companies to legally respect the Do Not Track header.

GPC is a valid Do Not Sell My Personal Information signal according to the California Consumer Privacy Act (CCPA), which stipulates that websites are legally required to respect a signal sent by users who want to opt-out of having their personal data sold. In July 2021, the California Attorney General clarified through an FAQ that under law, the Global Privacy Control signal must be honored.

On August 24, 2022, the California Attorney General announced Sephora paid a $1.2-million settlement for allegedly failing to process opt-out requests via a user-enabled global privacy control signal.

See also 
 Blur (browser extension)
 P3P
 Evil bit
 
 
 Better Business Bureau
 Data & Marketing Association

References

External links 
 IETF Internet Draft: Do Not Track: A Universal Third-Party Web Tracking Opt Out, March 7, 2011
 Do Not Track at Electronic Frontier Foundation
 Do Not Track at Mozilla
 Do Not Track at Securiti

Hypertext Transfer Protocol headers
Internet privacy